Burton Heights, Michigan was a small hamlet in Paris Township, Michigan, United States, established in 1833.  It was annexed into Grand Rapids, Michigan in 1910.

Sources

Populated places established in 1833
Populated places in Kent County, Michigan
1833 establishments in Michigan Territory